Timothy Mychael Patrick (born November 23, 1993) is an American football wide receiver for the Denver Broncos of the National Football League (NFL). He played college football at Utah.

Early life
Patrick was born in San Diego, California to Marsi Lovett and Tim Patrick. He attended University City High School in San Diego, where he played high school football for the Centurions. Tim grew up in a single parent home with his mother, older brother and younger sister.

College career
Prior to University of Utah, Patrick attended and played for Grossmont Community College in El Cajon, California. 
Patrick appeared in 22 games, of which he started 23, during his three seasons at Utah, finishing with 61 catches for 888 yards with five touchdowns. Patrick missed 17 games due to injuries during his time with Utah. In 2016, Patrick led the team with 45 receptions, 711 receiving yards, and five touchdown receptions.

Collegiate statistics

Professional career

Baltimore Ravens
Patrick signed with the Baltimore Ravens as an undrafted free agent on May 5, 2017. He was waived on July 30, 2017.

San Francisco 49ers
On July 31, 2017, Patrick was claimed by the San Francisco 49ers. He was waived on September 1, 2017.

Denver Broncos

On October 21, 2017, Patrick was signed to the Denver Broncos' practice squad. He was released on November 8, 2017. He was re-signed on November 15, 2017. He signed a reserve/future contract with the Broncos on January 1, 2018.

In the Broncos' Week 2 victory over the Oakland Raiders, Patrick recorded a 26-yard reception for the first one of his professional career. His reception came late in the game as the Broncos' were driving and helped set up the game-winning field goal. In a Week 8 loss to the Kansas City Chiefs, he scored his first professional receiving touchdown on a 24-yard reception. In the 2018 season, he had 23 receptions for 315 yards and a touchdown.

On September 11, 2019, Patrick was placed on injured reserve after suffering a broken hand in Week 1. He was designated for return from injured reserve on October 30, 2019, and began practicing with the team again. On November 15, 2019, Broncos activated Patrick off injured reserve. In the 2019 season, he appeared in eight games and totaled 16 receptions for 218 receiving yards.

Patrick signed a one-year exclusive-rights free agent tender with the Broncos on April 18, 2020. In Week 4 of the 2020 season against the New York Jets on Thursday Night Football, he recorded a career-high six receptions for 113 yards and a touchdown in the 37–28 victory. In Week 10 against the Las Vegas Raiders, Patrick was ejected from the game after he punched Raiders' safety Johnathan Abram.  Patrick was later punched by Abram's teammate Isaiah Johnson who was also ejected from the game. In Week 11 against the Miami Dolphins, Patrick recorded five catches for 119 yards, including a 61-yard catch on fourth down late in the fourth quarter to secure a 20–13 win for the Broncos. In Week 13 against the Kansas City Chiefs, he had four receptions for 44 receiving yards and two receiving touchdowns, in a 22–16 loss on Sunday Night Football. He appeared in and started 15 games for the Broncos in 2020. He finished with 51 receptions for 742 receiving yards and six receiving touchdowns. 

The Broncos placed a second-round restricted free agent tender on Patrick on March 16, 2021. He signed the one-year contract on May 18. On November 20, 2021, Patrick signed a three-year, $34.5 million contract extension with the Broncos. In the 2021 season, Patrick appeared in 16 games, all starts. He finished with 53 receptions for 734 receiving yards and five receiving touchdowns.

On August 2, 2022, Patrick suffered a torn ACL during practice, which prematurely ended his season. He was placed on injured reserve on August 3, 2022.

NFL statistics

References

External links

Denver Broncos bio
Utah Utes bio

Living people
1993 births
Players of American football from San Diego
American football wide receivers
Utah Utes football players
Baltimore Ravens players
San Francisco 49ers players
Denver Broncos players